Russ is an unincorporated community in Laclede County, in the Ozarks of south central Missouri. The community is located on Route HH, approximately six miles southeast of Lebanon.

History
A post office called Russ was established in 1890, and remained in operation until 1929. Russ Graves, an early postmaster, gave the community his first name.

References

Unincorporated communities in Laclede County, Missouri
Unincorporated communities in Missouri